The northeastern Brazilian dogfish (Squalus bahiensis) is a dogfish described in 2016. It is a member of the family Squalidae, found off the coast of Brazil.

References

Squalus
Fish of Brazil
Fish described in 2016